Etlingera sericea is a monocotyledonous plant species first described by Henry Nicholas Ridley, and given its current name by Rosemary Margaret Smith. Etlingera sericea is part of the genus Etlingera and the family Zingiberaceae.

The species' range is Sumatra. No subspecies are listed in the Catalog of Life.

References 

sericea
Taxa named by Rosemary Margaret Smith
Flora of Sumatra